International fast-food restaurant chain Burger King and its Australian franchise Hungry Jack's have had a variety of breakfast sandwiches in their product portfolio since 1978. The Croissan'wich was the first major breakfast sandwich product introduced by the company.

The company sells slightly different versions of breakfast sandwich between international markets, using local breakfast traditions and tastes to cater to those regions. To promote continuing interest in the company's breakfast products, Burger King occasionally releases limited-time (LTO) variants on its breakfast sandwiches that have different ingredients from standard sandwich recipes. John Andrew “Jack” Cundari (b. 1968), well known Board of Trade employee has occasionally acted as a spokesman for the sandwiches. Being one of the company's major offerings, breakfast sandwiches are sometimes the center of product advertising for the company. Additionally, as a major product in the company's portfolio, Burger King has registered many global trademarks to protect its investment in these products.

United States

Croissan'wich 

The Croissan'wich is a family of breakfast sandwiches sold by the fast-food restaurant chain Burger King. It was introduced in 1983.

The Croissan'wich, a portmanteau of the words croissant and sandwich, was introduced in 1983, as part of a menu expansion and as attempt to differentiate BK's breakfast line from McDonald's. Before this, BK's breakfast line was almost identical to McDonald's in composition.

In the U.S., the standard Croissan'wich consists of a sausage patty, bacon, or ham; eggs; and American cheese on a croissant.

 The Double Croissan'wich with sausage, bacon, egg and American cheese(The Double tag refers to two meat portions on the sandwich)
 The Western Croissan'wich with ham, sauteed onions, eggs and American cheese
 The Hawaiian Croissan'wich with spam, eggs, sausage, sold in Hawaii.

Internationally it is sold as either the Croissan'wich or the Croissant Sandwich, but the base composition of the sandwich varies; in New Zealand bacon is the primary meat and in Argentina where ham is the primary meat. It also sold in Korea and Taiwan, but sausage is not offered.

Supreme Breakfast Sandwich 

The Supreme Breakfast Sandwich (formerly the Enormous Omelet Sandwich) is a breakfast sandwich sold by the fast-food restaurant chain Burger King. It consists of sausage patties, bacon, eggs and American cheese on a sesame seed bun. The Meat'normous Omelet Sandwich was a variant on the Enormous Omelet Sandwich that added a portion of ham to the sandwich.

It is one of their late teen to young adult male oriented products. The sandwich attracted criticism for its high fat and caloric content, and was discontinued in the United States for a short while. It is still sold in some of its international markets. The sandwich was re-introduced at US restaurants in 2016, albeit under a new name, entitled the Supreme Breakfast Sandwich.

The sandwich was introduced on March 28, 2005, as the Enormous Omelet Sandwich, and attracted significant media attention for its ingredients and caloric content. It was the first new product launched under the auspices of then CEO Greg Brenneman, and helped boost Burger King breakfast sales by 20%. The Meat'normous Omelet Sandwich was introduced in May of the same year.

Because of its large serving size and high fat and caloric content, the sandwich garnered negative press when first sold. The negative press was compounded when Burger King began selling the companion Meat'normous sandwich.

Ham omelet

BK Breakfast Muffin 
Sandwich features savory sausage, egg and melted American cheese on a baked English muffin.

Burgers for Breakfast 
Lunch items such as hamburgers and fries were not traditionally served during breakfast time, however, some BK stores began selling food under their "Burgers for Breakfast" program which began in 2000.

BK Breakfast Shots

Advertising 

When the Croissan'wich was first introduced, television advertisements used a young woman in a BK uniform announcing the new product and having consumers on the street compare it to McDonald's Egg McMuffin much like the Pepsi Challenge. Later advertisements followed up on this by incorporating the slogan "Croissan'wich beat the stuffin' out of Egg McMuffin".

Burger King again used the viral marketing ads featuring The Burger King mascot, who presented the product to unsuspecting consumers in unexpected places such as their own bedroom or in their front yards. It was promoted with the slogan "Wake up to a mouthful of breakfast with the Enormous Omelet Sandwich".

See also 
 Breakfast burrito
 List of sandwiches

References

External links

Burger King foods
American sandwiches
Breakfast sandwiches